The Castlereagh League (also known as the Castlereagh Cup) is a rugby league competition in western New South Wales, Australia, run under the auspices of the Country Rugby League. For all intents and purposes the competition is effectively the Group 14 Rugby League senior competition.

Teams

The following clubs are fielding teams in the 2022 Christie Hood Castlereagh Cup:

Former Teams

Clubs Timeline 
Castlereagh Cup past & present participants, First Grade and Ladies League Tag.

History

Group 14
Group 14 is a junior rugby league competition in central New South Wales, Australia, run under the auspices of the Country Rugby League. This Group doesn't officially field a senior competition although the Castlereagh Cup is mostly made up of Group 14 clubs, is the official successor to the Group, and is called Group 14 on occasion. The Group 14 name is still applied to the junior competition

Current Teams
 Baradine Junior Sports Club
 Coolah Junior Sports Club (no seniors)
 Coonabarabran JRLFC
 Coonamble JRLFC
 Dunedoo Junior Rugby League and Netball Association 
 Gilgandra Junior Rugby League and Netball Association 
 Gulgong Junior Rugby League and Netball Club
 Walgett Dragons JRLC (Seniors play in Barwon Darling)

Former Structure
The competition was formerly divided into Eastern and Western divisions. The following clubs fielded teams in the 2006 Group 14 Eastern junior competition:

 Binnaway (fields a senior team in the Castlereagh Cup)
 Coolah (no senior team)
 Dunedoo (fields a senior team in the Castlereagh Cup)
 Gulgong (fields a senior team in the Castlereagh Cup)
 Merriwa (fields a senior team in Group 21)

While these clubs fielded teams in the 2006 Group 14 Western junior competition:

 Baradine (fields a senior team in the Castlereagh Cup)
 Coonabarabran (fields a senior team in the Castlereagh Cup)
 Coonamble (fields a senior team in the Castlereagh Cup)
 Gilgandra (fields a senior team in the Castlereagh Cup)
 Nyngan (fields a senior team in Group 11)

Group 14 Senior Grand Finals 
Group 14 Grand Finals (Recorded 1956-1998)

From The Vault on Wayback Machine

1956  Gilgandra             13-6  Binnaway

1957  ???

1958  ???

1959  ???

1960  ???

1961  Coonabarabran

1962  Coonabarabran

1963  ???

1964  Coonabarabran         10-7  Gilgandra

1965  ???

1966  Coonabarabran

1967  Dunedoo               18-18 Coonabarabran  (AET)
* Dunedoo won replay 16-8.

1968  Baradine              17-10 Dunedoo

1969  Baradine              10-9  Coonabarabran

1970  Coonabarabran         22-7  Gulgong

1971  Coonamble             31-4  Coonabarabran

1972  Coonabarabran         26-8  Baradine

1973  ???

1974  Coonamble             19-14

1975  ???

1976  ???

1977  ???                         Gilgandra

1978  ???

1979  ???

1980  ???                         Gilgandra

1981  Gilgandra             25-5  Baradine

1982  Coonamble                   Coonabarabran

1983  ???

1984  Mendooran

1985  ???

1986  ???

1987  Gilgandra             23-16 Nyngan  (AET)

1988  Coonabarabran         38-18 Dunedoo

1989  ???

1990  Coonabarabran         32-22 Orana

1991  Coonamble             30-26 Baradine

1992  ???

1993  Baradine              16-14 Coonamble

1994  Coonabarabran         22-18 Coonamble

1995  Baradine              40-14 Coonamble

1996  Coonamble            36-28 Nyngan

1997  Gilgandra             29-20 Walgett

1998  No competition

See also

Rugby League Competitions in Australia

References

External links and Sources
 Latest Castlereagh Cup table – from Sporting Pulse
 Castlereagh Cup on Country Rugby League's official site
 Rugby League Week at State Library of NSW Research and Collections
 Group 14 on Country Rugby League's official site
 Rugby League Week at State Library of NSW Research and Collections

Rugby league competitions in New South Wales
2001 establishments in Australia
Sports leagues established in 2001